"Angel's Son" is a song written by Clint Lowery and Lajon Witherspoon of Sevendust and performed by Witherspoon, fellow Sevendust members (drummer Morgan Rose and guitarist/vocalist Clint Lowery) and ex-Snot band member (now ex-Sevendust guitarist) Sonny Mayo, for the post-mortem compilation CD in honor of Snot founding vocalist James Lynn Strait known as Strait Up.

The Snot version of the song, credited to "Strait Up featuring Lajon" peaked at number 15 on the Billboard Modern Rock Tracks chart and number 11 on the Billboard Mainstream Rock Tracks chart. Sevendust recorded a studio version of the song for their 2001 album, Animosity.

Music video

Strait Up
The Strait Up version features the band with ex-Snot bandmates playing on a beach around a camp fire. Footage of James Lynn Strait who died with his dog Dobbs in a car accident, is superimposed during a vigil around the campfire, growing in attendance with appearances of fellow musicians and friends including members of System of a Down, Coal Chamber, Sugar Ray, Kittie, Incubus, Korn and others to say goodbye as a memorium title is revealed at the last moments of the song. Strait's mother is also featured in the video.

Animosity
The video opens up with a man walking through a hospital waiting room, and he's wearing an 'In Memory of Lynn Strait' T-shirt. Then the shot switches to an ER scene showing a man who is fighting for his life, and showing the urgency that goes on in the hospital trying to save his life. The band is shown playing in different parts of the hospital with the shots switching among each of the band members. Drummer Morgan Rose commented about the video, "I'm not really into videos where people are playing on fields or hospitals or places where there's no chance in hell that you'd see them play, but this actually turned out great." The video features all of the members of the band: lead vocalist, Lajon Witherspoon; guitarist, Clint Lowery; guitarist, John Connolly; drummer, Morgan Rose and bassist, Vinnie Hornsby.

References

Rock ballads
Sevendust songs
Songs written by Lajon Witherspoon
Songs written by Clint Lowery
TVT Records singles
Songs written by Morgan Rose
2002 singles
2000 songs